Safa Giray of Crimea (крым. Safa Geray, صفا كرای‎; 1637–1703) was briefly khan of the Crimean Khanate (1691–92), between the second and third reigns of his cousin Selim I Giray. His father was Safa Giray (died 1637), one of the many sons of khan Selâmet I Giray. 

In 1691 Selim I resigned and was replaced by Saadet III Giray who, after less than year, was removed by the Turks for military incompetence and replaced by Safa (December 1691). As kalga and nureddin he retained Devlet and Shahin Giray. He quickly became unpopular. He was accused of drunkenness, extortion, trading in soap and fish and tax farming. When the Ottomans called him to fight the Habsburgs most of the beys refused to go with him and the few who did gradually drifted away. The Crimeans requested that Selim I be restored, which was done. (October 1692). Safa settled on the isle of Rhodes, where he continued to trade.  In 1703 he died in Karnobat in modern Bulgaria and was buried in the courtyard of the local mosque.

Sources 
Henry Hoyle Howorth, History of the Mongols, 1880, Part 2, p. 565
Олекса Гайворонский «Созвездие Гераев». Симферополь, 2003.
In the absence of a proper source in English, this is mostly extracted from the Russian Wikipedia which apparently follows Gaivoronsky. Howorth is old and has only one paragraph.

Crimean Khans
1637 births
1703 deaths